Victor Matthews may refer to:

Victor Matthews, Baron Matthews (1919–1995), newspaper proprietor
Victor H. Matthews (born 1950), Old Testament scholar
Victor J. Matthews (1941–2004), classical scholar
Victor Matthews (artist) (born 1963), American artist
Vic Matthews (born 1934), British Olympic hurdler